Photinula coerulescens is a species of sea snail, a marine gastropod mollusk in the family Calliostomatidae.

Description
The length of the shell attains 22.5 mm.

Distribution
This marine species occurs off Patagonia.

References

 Hombron J.B. & Jacquinot H. (1848 [November]). Atlas d'Histoire Naturelle. Zoologie par MM. Hombron et Jacquinot, chirurgiens de l'expédition. in: Voyage au Pôle Sud et dans l'Océanie sur les corvettes l'Astrolabe et la Zélée pendant les années 1837-1838-1839-1840 sous le commandement de M. Dumont-D'Urville capitaine de vaisseau publié sous les auspices du département de la marine et sous la direction supérieure de M. Jacquinot, capitaine de Vaisseau, commandant de La Zélée. Vingt-cinquiéme livraison. Mollusques pls 14, 16, 19, 22; Insectes lépidoptéres pl. 3.

External links
 King, P.P. (1832) Description of the Cirrhipeda, Conchifera and Mollusca, in a collection formed by the officers of H.M.S. Adventure and Beagle employed between the years 1826 and 1830 in surveying the southern coasts of South America, including the Straits of Magalhaens and the coast of Tierra del Fuego. Zoological Journal, 5: 332-349
 Rochebrune A.T. de & Mabille J. (1889). Mollusques. in: Mission Scientifique du Cap Horn 1882-1883. Tome 6 (Zoologie 2, part 8). Paris, Gauthiers-Villars. H.1-H.129, pls. 1-8
 Philippi, (R.) A. (1845). Diagnosen einiger neuen Conchylien. Archiv für Naturgeschichte. 11: 50-71
 Fischer, P. (1875–1880). Genres Calcar, Trochus, Xenophora, Tectarius et Risella. In: Kiener, L. C. Spécies général et iconographie des coquilles vivantes.... Paris: J-B. Baillère et fils, Vol. 11. Pp. i–iii, 1–480, pls 1–120
 To Antarctic Invertebrates
 To Biodiversity Heritage Library (5 publications)
 To Encyclopedia of Life
 To USNM Invertebrate Zoology Mollusca Collection
 To World Register of Marine Species

Calliostomatidae
Gastropods described in 1832